The Bezengi Glacier is a vast valley-type glacier in the Republic of Kabardino-Balkaria, Russia, near the northern slope of the Main Caucasian Range of the Caucasus.

Morphology
The Bezengi Glacier runs from the peaks of Shkhara and Janga until it drops to height 2000 m.  Glacier area 36 km, length 17.6 km, tongue about 9 km. Much of the tongue of the mare is covered with moraines and fragments. The Bezengi Glacier is a source of the river Cherek.

See also
 List of glaciers in Russia

References

Glaciers of Russia
Landforms of Kabardino-Balkaria
Glaciers of the Caucasus